This is a list of seasons completed by the Creighton Bluejays football team. Creighton fielded their first team in 1900 under Herbert Whipple.

Seasons

Notes

References

Creighton

Creighton Bluejays football seasons